California Star is the name of several ships, including

, a Blue Star Line refrigerated ship built in 1938 and torpedoed and sunk in 1943 by the 
, a wartime refrigerated fast cargo liner, built as Empire Clarendon later part of Blue Star Line 
, a refrigerated cargo ship of the Blue Star Line, later named Fremantle Star
, a refrigerated container ship, built as Willowbank renamed California Star in 1980, and lastly named Golden Gate
, a Mexican roll-on/roll-off ferry, built as Stena Forwarder renamed in 2003

Ship names